Bronson (stylised in all caps) is the eponymous debut studio album by Bronson, the collaborative project of American DJs Odesza and Australian producer Golden Features. It was released on 7 August 2020, delayed from an initial 17 July release.

The album debuted and peaked at number 22 on the ARIA Albums Chart in Australia on 17 August 2020 and at number 5 on the US Top Dance/Electronic Albums Chart on 22 August 2020.

Background
The album follows Golden Features' 2019 collaborative EP Raka with The Presets and Odesza's Grammy nominated 2017 album A Moment Apart. Golden Features previously remixed Odesza's song "Falls" in October 2018.

Odesza members Harrison Mills and Clayton Knight bonded with Thomas Stell over a mutual admiration of each other's music, sending demos to one another over Dropbox. After multiple studio sessions over FaceTime, they eventually met up in order to record together, which led to the creation of the album.

Release and promotion
The album was announced on 27 April via Twitter, with Odesza posting on their account: "Just finished an entire album with Golden Features." Thomas Stell additionally posted: "Let me introduce you to BRONSON. A full album from myself and my brothers ODESZA coming soon."

The album was originally scheduled to release on 17 July 2020, but was delayed to 7 August.

Singles
Four singles were released from the album: "Heart Attack" (featuring lau.ra) and "Vaults" on 28 April 2020, "Dawn" (featuring Totally Enormous Extinct Dinosaurs) on 30 June 2020, and "Keep Moving" on 21 July 2020.

Recording
Bronson was produced by Harrison Mills, Clayton Knight, and Thomas Stell.

Recording on the album began in 2018, in Berry, New South Wales, and was finalised in 2020.

Composition
Bronson is primarily a house, electro, and EDM album.

Themes
In a statement regarding the album's themes, Bronson stated the record is about:"[Their] respective needs to challenge personal struggles, both internal and external. Moreover, the trio recognized that their own battles were merely microcosms of the surrounding world. The hope was to craft a body of work that was reflective of that duality of lightness and darkness inherent to the human condition.

Artwork
The cover artwork depicts a man holding his head in his hands, with the letters "Bro" and "Nson" written in capital letters on his left and right hands, respectively. The album title is displayed in white text at the bottom of the image.

Critical reception
Ross Goldenberg of Dancing Astronaut stated: "With  all tracks seamlessly transitioning into one another, Bronson maintains a balanced pool of lighter additions." He additionally described the album as "a promising first chapter".

Sophie Bress, also of Dancing Astronaut, called the album "a maze of sound, brimming with contradictions. It is expected but not predictable, surprising but not shocking, sonically diverse but not disjointed." Bress also noted the album "brings together their distinct styles", describing the result as a "multitudinous and emotive musical collection that defies classification".

Allie Gregory of Exclaim! praised the album as "a wholesome, heartfelt approach to electronic dance music that appeals to emotion before aesthetics." Gregory also stated she "hope[s] to hear from [them] again in the future."

Ryan Middleton of Magnetic Magazine described the album as "tough and gritty" and praised its "intricate melodies". Middleton also favourably compared the track "Tense" to Gesaffelstein's production work.

Commercial performance
In Australia, Bronson debuted and peaked at number 22 on the ARIA Albums Chart for the chart dated 17 August 2020, before falling into the lower fifty the following week.

In the United States, the album debuted and peaked at number 5 on Billboards Top Dance/Electronic Albums Chart, before exiting the chart a week later.

Track listing
All tracks were written by all members of Bronson, with the exception of featured artists. All tracks produced by Bronson.

Notes
 All track titles are stylised in all caps.
 "Blackout" was the original title for "Keep Moving", but was changed in the final tracklist.

Personnel
Adapted from the album's liner notes.

Bronson
 Harrison Mills – producer 
 Clayton Knight – producer 
 Thomas Stell – producer 
Other musicians
 Laura Bettinson – vocals 
 Christopher Joseph Gallant III – vocals 
 Orlando Tobias Edward Higginbottom – vocals

Charts

Year-end charts

Release history

References

2020 debut albums
Bronson (group) albums
Electro albums by Australian artists
Electro albums by American artists
House music albums by Australian artists
House music albums by American artists